Ayesha Raza Mishra (born 26 September 1977) is an Indian actress.

Career 
Ayesha Raza Mishra began her career working in theatre, advertisements, and television shows. She went on to portray motherly roles in several films including Madaari, Befikre (2016), Toilet – Ek Prem Katha (2017) and Sonu Ke Titu Ki Sweety (2018). She garnered acclaim for her portrayal of a noisy, comical Punjabi mother in Veere Di Wedding. She went on to play Gunjan Saxena's mother in Gunjan Saxena: The Kargil Girl.

Personal life
Ayesha is married to actor Kumud Mishra. They have a son Kabir. Her grand aunts include Zohra Sehgal and Uzra Butt.

Filmography

Films and web series

Television

References

External links
 

20th-century Indian actresses
21st-century Indian actresses
Actresses in Hindi cinema
Living people
Punjabi people
1977 births